Agustí Villaronga Riutort (4 March 1953 – 22 January 2023) was a Spanish film director, screenwriter and actor. He directed several feature films, a documentary, three projects for television and three shorts. His film Moon Child was entered into the 1989 Cannes Film Festival.

His auteur approach to filmmaking was described by ScreenDaily as demostrative of "a keen insight into human pain and cruelty". In 2011 he won the Goya Award for Best Director for Black Bread. The Catalan-language film was selected as the Spanish entry for the Best Foreign Language Film at the 84th Academy Awards, but it did not make the final shortlist.

Life and career
Agustí Villaronga was born on 4 March 1953 in Palma, his grandparents had been itinerant puppeteers and his father was a child of the Spanish Civil War, a fact that would resurface repeatedly in the director's filmography. Since childhood, his father encouraged his love for films and from early in his life he wanted to become a film director. He worked as an actor and made some shorts.

Villaronga made his directorial debut in 1986 with the film In a Glass Cage, which was selected by the Berlin film festival receiving critical praise and many awards. The plot follows a former Nazi doctor, now paralyzed and depending on an iron lung to live, who begins to be taken care of by a young man, one of the children he abused during the war. In a Glass Cage already shows some of the key elements in Villaronga's filmography: a disturbed childhood marked by violence, an early discovery of sexuality.

His second film, Moon Child (1989), is about a child who goes to Africa to join a tribe awaiting the arrival of white child God. In 1992 he made a documentary, Al-Andalus, produced by Sogetel and the MoMa of New York city. For some years Villaronga tried unsuccessfully to find financing to adapt a novel by Mercè Rodoreda, La mort i la primavera. Instead he had to take some commission works. One of these was El pasajero clandestino, an adaptation of a Georges Simenon novel, that lacked the personal characteristics of his filmography.

Called by actress María Barranco, Villaronga directed the 1997 horror film 99.9, which won the award for Best Cinematography at the 1997 Sitges Film Festival. In 2000, Villaronga came back with a project of his own: El mar, a story set in Mallorca about three former childhood friends, traumatized by the violence they experienced during the Spanish civil war, that are reunited ten years later as young adults. The key elements in Villaronga's filmography are present in this story: childhood, sexual awakening, homosexuality and violence.

In 2002, Villaronga  co-directed with Lydia Zimmermann and Isaac Pierre Racine the film Aro Tolbukhin: In the Mind of a Killer. In 2005 he directed a music video for French superstar Mylène Farmer's song Fuck Them All. In 2007 he made Después de la lluvia, a made for television project adapting a stage play. It was only until 2010 with Black Bread, when Villaronga finally achieved wider appeal. This film, winner of nine Goya Awards including best film and best director, tells the story of an eleven year old boy who growing up in the harsh period of the aftermath of the Spanish Civil War in Catalonia's countryside discovers the world of lies around him.

Villaronga followed Black Bread'''s success with  A Letter to Evita, a TV miniseries co-produced by TV3, which recounts a real episode in the life of Eva Perón while visiting Spain in the late 1940s.

Villaronga was openly gay. He died on 22 January 2023 in Barcelona, at the age of 69. At the time of his death, he had one project, Stormy Lola, outstanding. It was shot in 2022, and was his first comedy film.

Villaronga received the Gold Medal of Merit in the Fine Arts on 1 December 2022.

Filmography as director

Other projects
 Anta mujer (1976) - Short
  (1980) - Short
 Laberint (1980) - Short
 Fuck Them All'' (2005) - Music video for Mylène Farmer

Accolades

References

External links
 

1953 births
2023 deaths
20th-century Spanish male actors
Best Director Goya Award winners
Film directors from Catalonia
Catalan-language film directors
French-language film directors
Spanish gay writers
Spanish gay actors
LGBT film directors
Spanish LGBT actors
Spanish LGBT screenwriters
Male screenwriters
People from Palma de Mallorca
Spanish-language film directors
Spanish male film actors
Spanish male writers
20th-century Spanish screenwriters
20th-century Spanish male writers
21st-century Spanish LGBT people
21st-century Spanish screenwriters